Norway and Taiwan have no official relations.

Overview
Officially Norway–Taiwan relations are conducted at arms length so as not to offend China. Since being strongly punished by the Chinese government the Norwegian government has been wary of taking any action which might be viewed negatively by the Chinese, even if it goes against their values. China had been offended by the award of the Nobel Peace Prize to Liu Xiaobo in 2010.

Norway has a One China policy.

History 
In 2014 Gro Harlem Brundtland was awarded the Tang Prize in sustainable development.

In 2010 the Norwegian government began listing "China" as the nationality of Taiwanese citizens instead of "Taiwan" on visas, identity cards, and other official documents. In 2018 a group of Taiwanese students studying in Norway sued the Norwegian government over the relabeling, the litigants said, "At the time, we did not receive a positive response from the Norwegian government through the diplomatic channel, so we decided to take legal action. For us, it is normal to defend our rights and interests by exercising litigation in a country with democracy and the rule of law." In 2020 the Supreme Court of Norway rejected the lawsuit on the grounds that the claimants had not demonstrated substantial damage to their wellbeing as a result of the change. The claimants then appealed the decision to the European Court of Human Rights.

In November 2020 Taiwanese Foreign Minister Joseph Wu publicly urged the Norwegian government to correct their mislabelling of Taiwanese nationals calling it a human rights violation and expressed support for the legal campaign.

See also  
 China-Norway relations 
 Denmark-Taiwan relations

References 

Norway
Taiwan
Norway–Taiwan relations
Foreign relations of Taiwan